Women in the Young Lords, a Puerto Rican nationalist group founded in the United States in 1969, advocated for racial and gender equality and challenged patriarchy in the organization from 1969-1976. Women members wrote articles in the Palante newspaper critiquing sexist and patriarchal structures and demanded a series of reproductive rights that included access to abortion and an end to forced sterilization. In November 1970, women consisted of roughly forty percent of the group’s membership and were between the ages of 13 and 28. Despite their considerable presence in the YLP, female members were consistently overlooked to occupy high-ranking leadership positions. However, in 1970 Denise Oliver-Vélez was appointed as Minister of Economic Development and became the highest ranking woman in the party.

Women in the Young Lords made significant contributions to the daily maintenance of the organization. They led free breakfast programs for children in local churches as well as educational workshops for community members. Maintaining their commitment to feminism and female liberation, they worked on the Young Lords Party Position Paper on Women, which explicitly linked traditional family structures as initial sites of female oppression. The Young Lords Party Position Paper on Women was later included in The Young Lords: A Reader (2010), edited by Darrel Enck-Wanzer (see external links below for the full text of that book). The paper would go on to cement the Young Lords as a main organization in the fight for gender equality at the time.
Iris Morales, a former Young Lord and grassroots organizer, has worked to preserve the legacy of women in the party today. In 1994, she directed a documentary ¡Palante, Siempre Palante!, chronicling the life of the Young Lords from its inception in 1969 to its fragmentation and ultimate demise in 1976. Her role in documenting the history of the party and centering women throughout her work highlights another instance of female leadership in the Puerto Rican nationalist organization to this day. Iris Morales was cofounder of the Women's Caucus and the Women's Union. Her book Through the Eyes of Rebel Women documents the experiences of women in the Young Lords.

Early change
In its early stages as an organization, machismo was widespread within the Young Lords. Men relegated women to peripheral roles in leadership and subjected them to stereotypical assignments like secretary work. In response to these machista attitudes, several female members formed their own women’s caucus in 1969. They met to confront sexism within the party. The Women's Caucus put together a list of ten demands that it presented to the Central Committee that addressed issues such as promoting women to the Central Committee, child care, making men accountable for sexist behavior, and expanding the political education of women. Eventually the organization's 13-Point Program was changed. The point absurdly said, “Machismo must be revolutionary and not oppressive.” Denise Oliver-Vélez was quoted saying, “I was in the Young Lords, and one of the points in the original program was ‘Revolutionary Machismo.’ Machismo is reactionary, so you can’t have revolutionary machismo. We women weren’t having it. So we made a very different kind of statement. ‘We want equality for women. Down with machismo and male chauvinism.” To this day, that revision remains a part of the final Thirteen Point Platform.

The women’s caucus issued demands to the Central Committee of the organization that called for an end to sexual discrimination and the full inclusion of women into the leadership of the Lords. The Central Committee reacted by quickly promoting Denise Oliver-Vélez and Gloria Fontanez to the Central Committee. They also adopted a new slogan, ¡Abajo con el machismo! (Down with Machismo!). However, these changes did not happen immediately and women still faced sexism within the party regularly. Oliver-Vélez became aware of gendered assumptions made by the central committee about who could and could not perform certain tasks. Even when women were assigned to posts in various ministries, including the Defense Ministry, they were disproportionately assigned traditional "women's work" like child care and secretarial tasks.

Some changes could be seen as stricter guidelines were placed on the men within the party to respect their female counterparts both inside and outside of the organization. For example, Felipe Luciano was demoted from his position as Central Committee chairman and organization spokesperson for violating the rules of discipline.  The first public mention of Luciano’s demotion appeared in a New York Times article on September 5, 1970 stating that he had been charged with “male chauvinism, unclear politics, political individualism, and lack of development” as the reasons for his removal from leadership.[i] [i]. “Young Lords Council Removes Luciano as National Chairman,” New York Times, September 5, 1970.

Position Paper on Women

One of the major contributions women made to the success of the Young Lords Party was working on the Young Lords Party Position Paper on Women, published in 1970, which was later included in The Young Lords: A Reader (2010), edited by Darrel Enck-Wanzer (see external links below for the full text of that book). Denise Oliver-Vélez helped construct the document and theorized the intersection of race and class in the lives of women of color. The paper outlined the expectations placed on women and how their value in society is tied to their potential in the household and in the kitchen. It indicted the practice of sterilization in Puerto Rico that had happening since the 1930s. It also denounced the use of birth control pills, since they had been tested on Puerto Rican women for fifteen years. They had been tied to cancer and death from blood clotting.

Legacy
Women in the Young Lords were subject to harsh criticism and backlash by the male-dominated Central Committee as well as men in their communities who saw their involvement as an affront to culture and established gender norms. In 1970, women started making demands, occupying space in group meetings and challenging male authority on an institutional level. Women in the Puerto Rican activist organization the Young Lords made significant contributions to the programs and platform of said organization. They were situated within the ranking system and performed the labor for free meal and clothing drives. To this day, the women who made up the Young Lords from 1969 to 1976 struggle to receive the same recognition as their male counterparts. With the publication of Through the Eyes of Rebel Women: The Young Lords 1969-1976 in 2016 by Iris Morales, more information about the role women had in the Young Lords is coming to light and being celebrated.

References

1969 establishments in the United States
1976 disestablishments in the United States
Defunct American political movements
Far-left politics in the United States
Feminist organizations in the United States
Puerto Rican nationalism